Reddish Vale is in the  Tame Valley close to Reddish, Greater Manchester, England. The centre of the vale is around the bottom of Reddish Vale Road. Reddish Vale Country Park is a country park managed by Stockport Metropolitan Borough Council.  It covers 161 hectares in all and comprises some of the traditional Reddish Vale area, Reddish Vale Farm and the grazing land and Woodhall Fields, about half a mile to the south. Part of it is a designated local nature reserve.

Description
Reddish Vale is mainly green space, comprising woodland, flat riverside meadows, sloping fields used to graze horses and a golf course. At the end of Reddish Vale Road near  is a small car park and a visitor centre housed in portable cabins. A number of footpaths lead in all directions, with the more popular ones following the line of the river, both up and downstream.

Highly visible from the visitor centre is the sixteen-arch brick viaduct built in 1875 to carry the Hope Valley Line over the Tame Valley.  There is a legend that during construction a local witch cursed the viaduct and anyone who counted the number of arches.  A railway line once led to Stockport from Reddish Junction at the Brinnington (east) side of the viaduct. This line has been turned into a public bridleway joining the two parts of the country park and forms a section of the Trans Pennine Trail. The Stockport–Stalybridge line forms part of the western boundary of the vale. A spur once ran to the colliery at Denton.  Its position is still visible in places marked by a hedgerow that runs alongside Ross Lave Lane. Where the line had to span Denton Brook an embankment was built using slag and other waste from the mine. This slag was ignited by the hot summers of 1975 and 1976. It continued to smoulder and smoke for a number years until the site was bulldozed and cleared in 1981. Train drivers called the place 'smokey ridge', along the bottom of Denton Brook you can still see the bricks used for the tunnel. Some locals refer to Ross Lave Lane as 'piggy's alley' as there was once a pig farm on the Denton side of the viaduct on the embankment above where Denton Brook joins the River Tame. There was a plan at the end of the 18th century for the Beat Bank Branch Canal to run across the vale, and some sections were dug, but it was abandoned before completion.

Nearby are two mill ponds left over from industrial activity in the vale. The ponds were fed from the river above a weir (destroyed in floods in the 1960s, all that remains is the sluice gate) on the upstream side of the viaduct, and provided both power and processing water to Reddish Vale Print Works, a calico printing works dating from before 1800.  The works had ceased printing by 1975, and have now been demolished and the land turned into a butterfly park. The ponds are now used for angling, and attract herons and a variety of ducks. Most of the race has been filled in, but a short length carries Denton Brook down to the river. Denton Brook (and a small tributary) marks the traditional boundary between Reddish and Denton. The manorial corn mill (one of several to be known as Reddish Mill) was sited over the brook and was demolished in about 1860 when the ponds were extended.

Woodhall Fields form the southern or lower (with reference to the river) part of the park. The weir here was used to feed the Portwood Cut, dug in 1796, which ran to the Portwood area of Stockport and powered a number of mills around the start of the 19th century. Part of the fields were once a landfill site for fly ash; this has proved to be a good growing medium for orchids.

Whilst not really in the vale, at the northern end the late 16th century Arden Hall or 'Cromwell's Castle' (where Oliver Cromwell allegedly spent the night) and the 17th century Hyde Hall overlook it and form part of the overall landscape. Both are in private hands and not open to the public.

Other activities
Reddish Vale Golf Club takes up a substantial area on both sides of the river, but does not form part of the country park. The club house was once a substantial private house in its own grounds.

Just above the visitor centre, on Reddish Vale Road, is Reddish Vale Farm, with riding stables, meerkats and a children's farm. The buildings and associated grazing were Stockton's Dairy Farm until 1996.

The Trans Pennine Trail and the Tame Valley Walk pass through the park.

Housing
There is now very little housing in the vale. There are 12 terraced houses opposite the farm on the road leading down to the vale. At the bottom of the road opposite the visitors centre is a large dwelling known as Tame House. Tame House was once the offices for the Calico print works. At the back of Tame House is a dirt track called Riverview; there are kennels for racing greyhounds halfway down the track. This was once the canteen for the workers at the print works. Adjacent to the canteen was a large Victorian house but this was demolished in the 1960s. Further along Riverview, where the track meets the river, once stood two rows of terraced houses identical to the ones opposite the farm. These were also demolished in the 1960s after being declared 'slum dwellings'. The same fate may have befallen the terraces opposite the farm if not for the intervention of two twin brothers, John and Christopher Byrne, who removed the Compulsory Purchase Orders put on them, and organised the installation of a sanitation system.

There were nine houses situated between the viaduct and the mill ponds, built to house the workers constructing the viaduct. They were later demolished for expansion of the reservoirs. On the opposite side of the river to where Strines Weir once was there were two houses known as Strines Cottages which were farm dwellings. A recent archaeological dig found the foundations of these structures. There was a flour mill situated above Denton Brook not far from Mill Lane. In later years it was used as a school and was known as 'the ark' because of the flowing water visible through the gaps in the floorboards. It appears that there has never been a church in the vale.

Recent threats
Recent proposals to change the nature of the vale have been met with robust opposition.
In 1988, the government of the day asked the Greater Manchester Residuary Body to sell off its holdings in the area; 3,000 people, worried that it would be sold to developers, gathered in the vale to protest.  The land was acquired by Stockport Council in 1995.  They arrived as three contingents from Brinnington, North Reddish and South Reddish.

In 1990, a proposal to create an artificial ski slope at Woodhall Fields was opposed by 7,000 signatories to a petition.  The opposition was led by the Tame Valley Defence Group supported by MP Andrew Bennett and the Reddish Reporter. The Defence Group had made trips to the various ski slopes and supplied local people with reports on Sheffield Ski Slope. This proposal echoed an earlier proposal for a snow dome which was opposed by South Reddish Action Group, who were later to merge with the Tame Valley Defence Group to protect the vale.

In 1992, the golf club hoped to use part of the vale as landfill; the plans did not come to fruition.  This again was opposed by the Tame Valley Defence Group who were strongly supported in this by the Director of Public Health in Stockport.

References

External links

 Reddish Vale's Community Website Information About Reddish Vale's Flora and Fauna, History and News.
 Reddish Vale Country Park website
 Map showing the boundaries of the country park

Parks and commons in the Metropolitan Borough of Stockport
Reddish Vale Country Park
Local Nature Reserves in Greater Manchester